The 2014 United States Senate election in Kansas was held on November 4, 2014, to elect a member of the United States Senate to represent the State of Kansas, concurrently with other elections to the United States Senate in other states and elections to the United States House of Representatives and various state and local elections.

Incumbent Republican Senator Pat Roberts was re-elected to a fourth term against Independent Greg Orman and Libertarian nominee Randall Batson. The Democratic nominee, Chad Taylor, withdrew from the race.

Republican primary 
Roberts gained negative press attention after criticism that he did not own a home in Kansas, with some comparing the situation to that of former Indiana Senator Richard Lugar, who lost a 2012 Senate primary after a similar residency controversy. Roberts owns a home in Alexandria, Virginia. The primary was held August 5, 2014.

Primary opponent Milton R. Wolf, a radiologist, was under investigation by a state medical ethics board for posting X-ray images of dead patients with macabre commentary to Facebook.

Candidates

Declared 
 Pat Roberts, incumbent Senator
 D.J. Smith, former Osawatomie City Councilwoman
 Milton R. Wolf, radiologist, conservative commentator and Barack Obama's Second Cousin
 Alvin Zahnter, truck driver and Vietnam War veteran

Declined 
 Tim Huelskamp, U.S. Representative (re-elected to House) 
 Kris Kobach, Secretary of State of Kansas (re-elected as Secretary of State)
 Dennis Pyle, state senator
 Todd Tiahrt, former U.S. Representative (ran for KS-04)

Endorsements

Polling 

 ^ Internal poll for the Pat Roberts campaign

Results

Democratic primary

Candidates

Declared 
 Chad Taylor, Shawnee County District Attorney
 Patrick Wiesner, attorney and candidate for the U.S. Senate in 2010

Declined 
 Kathleen Sebelius, former United States Secretary of Health and Human Services and former Governor of Kansas

Polling

Results

Libertarian primary

Candidates

Declared 
 Randall Batson, nominee for the State House in 2012

Independents

Candidates

Declared 
 Greg Orman, businessman, who briefly ran in the Democratic Primary in 2008 before dropping out.

General election

Campaign 
On September 3, Democratic nominee Chad Taylor withdrew from the race. On September 4, Kris Kobach, the Republican Kansas Secretary of State, announced that Taylor would remain on the ballot because state law demands he declare himself "incapable of fulfilling the duties of office if elected" in order to be removed, which he did not do. Taylor challenged the decision, and on September 18 the Kansas Supreme Court decided that his name would be taken off the ballot.

On the same day, Kobach demanded the chairman of the Democratic Party name a replacement in eight days, saying he will consider litigation to force the party if they refuse.

A registered Democrat with family ties to Republican Governor Sam Brownback's campaign also filed a petition with the Kansas Supreme Court on September 18 to force the Democratic Party to name a new candidate. Kobach ordered ballots to be mailed to overseas voters on September 20 without a Democratic candidate, but included a disclaimer that another ballot will be sent if the Democratic Party names a replacement candidate.

The state district court in Shawnee County  threw out the petition, meaning no replacement for Taylor needed to be named.

In the 2002 Senate election, Roberts also had no Democratic opponent.

Roberts defeated Orman in the general election, winning reelection to a fourth term in office.

If Orman had been elected, the U.S. Senate would have had three independent Senators for the first time in the chamber's history.  This—and the question of whom Orman would choose to caucus with if elected—were very large questions in the electoral contest, and because the Kansas race was showing tight in the polls, a subject of considerable national political discourse as well.

Fundraising

Debates 
 Complete video of debate, October 8, 2014
 Complete video of debate, October 15, 2014

Endorsements

Predictions

Polling 

With Huelskamp

With Roberts

With Wolf

Results

See also 
 2014 United States Senate elections
 2014 United States elections
 2014 United States House of Representatives elections in Kansas
 2014 Kansas gubernatorial election
 2014 Kansas elections

Notes

References

External links 
 U.S. Senate elections in Kansas, 2014 at Ballotpedia
 Campaign contributions at OpenSecrets

Official campaign websites
 Pat Roberts for U.S. Senate
 Randall Batson for U.S. Senate
 Greg Orman for U.S. Senate

2014
Kansas
United States Senate